Eta Apodis, Latinized from η Apodis, is a star in the southern circumpolar constellation Apus. With an apparent visual magnitude of +4.9, it can be viewed with the naked eye from the southern hemisphere.

Properties
This star has about 1.77 times the mass of the Sun and 2.13 times the Sun's radius. It is radiating 15.5 times the luminosity of the Sun from its outer atmosphere at an effective temperature of 7,860 K. Eta Apodis is a young star with an age of about 250 million years.

The stellar classification of Eta Apodis shows this to be an Am star, which means the spectrum shows chemically peculiarities. In particular, it is an A2-type star showing an excess of the elements chromium and europium. The spectrum displays magnetically-induced features indicating an estimated surface field strength of roughly 360 G. Based upon observations with the Spitzer Space Telescope, this system is emitting an excess of 24 μm infrared radiation. This may be caused by a debris disk of dust orbiting at a distance of more than 31 astronomical units from the star.

Naming

References

123998
Apodis, Eta
Apus (constellation)
069896
5303
Durchmusterung objects
Am stars